Cucullia improba is a moth of the family Noctuidae first described by Hugo Theodor Christoph in 1885. It is found in the south-eastern Caucasus, Turkmenistan, Uzbekistan, Iran, Afghanistan, Turkey, Jordan and Israel.

Adults are on wing from March to April. There is one generation per year.

The larvae probably feed on Artemisia species.

Subspecies
Cucullia improba improba
Cucullia improba muelleri (Israel)

External links

Cucullia
Moths described in 1885
Moths of the Middle East